Alinovi is an Italian surname. Notable people with the surname include:

Abdon Alinovi (1923–2018), Italian politician
Giuseppe Alinovi (1811–1848), Italian painter 

Italian-language surnames